Born to Mack is the fourth studio album and debut major label album by American rapper Too Short. The album was released in 1987 via Dangerous Music. It was re-released in 1988 by Jive Records/RCA, after the success of Life Is...Too Short, although Jive Records logos did not appear on it until it was released on compact disc in 1989.

Too Short sold around 50,000 copies of the album directly from the trunk of his car.

Critical reception
Trouser Press wrote that Too Short made "weak work of simple beats and unconvincing boasts, big-booty fantasies ('Freaky Tales,' 'Partytime'), ugly putdowns ('Dope Fiend Beat') and jailbait concerns ('Little Girls')." The Spin Alternative Record Guide wrote that the album elevates "the 75 Girl formula without abandoning it."

Track listing

Charts

References

Too Short albums
1987 albums
Jive Records albums